Gabon competed at the 1984 Summer Olympics in Los Angeles, United States.  The nation returned to the Olympic Games after boycotting both the 1976 and 1980 Games.

Athletics

Women
Track & road events

Field events

Boxing

Men

References
Official Olympic Reports

Nations at the 1984 Summer Olympics
1984
Oly